The Andorra national under-19 football team represents Andorra in international football at this age level and is controlled by Federació Andorrana de Futbol, the governing body for football in Andorra.

UEFA European Under-19 Championship Record

Current squad
The following players were called for the matches against Czech Republic, Greece and Switzerland on 21, 24 and 27 September 2022.
Caps and goals correct as of 27 September 2022, after the match against Switzerland.

See also
 Andorra national football team

Andorra national football team
European national under-19 association football teams